Peter Jakubech (born 22 June 1971) is a retired Slovak football goalkeeper.

References

1971 births
Living people
Slovak footballers
FK Hvězda Cheb players
1. FC Tatran Prešov players
FC Spartak Trnava players
MŠK Žilina players
MFK Ružomberok players
1. FK Příbram players
SK Dynamo České Budějovice players
Partizán Bardejov players
FC Steel Trans Ličartovce players
Association football goalkeepers
Czech First League players
Slovak expatriate footballers
Expatriate footballers in the Czech Republic
Slovak expatriate sportspeople in the Czech Republic